Glyptolenoides is a genus of beetles in the family Carabidae, containing the following species:

 Glyptolenoides azureipennis (Chaudoir, 1859)
 Glyptolenoides azureus (Chaudoir, 1859)
 Glyptolenoides balli Moret, 2005
 Glyptolenoides cyclothorax (Chaudoir, 1879)
 Glyptolenoides elegantulus (Chaudoir, 1878)
 Glyptolenoides germaini Perrault, 1991
 Glyptolenoides purpuripennis (Chaudoir, 1879)
 Glyptolenoides siemeradskii Perrault, 1991
 Glyptolenoides sulcipennis (Chaudoir, 1879)
 Glyptolenoides sulcitarsis (Chaudoir, 1878)

References

Platyninae